IDC may refer to:

Organizations
 Independent Democratic Conference, members of the New York State Senate
 India Delivery Center, for example Microsoft's in HITEC City
 Industrial Development Corporation, also known as Castle Grande, an Arkansas company involved in the Whitewater political controversy
 Information Dominance Corps, a group of US Navy military information specialties
 Institute of Democracy and Cooperation, a think tank based in Paris
 Interactive Data Corporation, a financial services company
 InterDigital Communications, a telecommunications company
 Interdnestrcom, a mobile telephone broadband provider in Transnistria, Moldova
 International Data Corporation, a market research company
 International Detention Coalition, a non-government organization advocating for human rights
 Invensys Development Centre, a global common software development centre
 Islands District Council, the district council for the Islands District in Hong Kong

Schools
 Imperial Defence College, former name of the Royal College of Defence Studies, a British military academy (and post nominal letters used by graduates)
 Industrial Design Centre, part of IIT Bombay, India
 Institut de cognitique, a school of engineering in France
 Institute of design and construction, a technical school in Brooklyn, NY, US
 Interdisciplinary Center Herzliya, the former (and still commonly used) name of Reichman University in Israel
 Paris Institute of Comparative Law, France

Medical
 Dilated cardiomyopathy, a disease of the heart muscle
 Immature dendritic cells, a type of dendritic cell
 Indwelling Catheter, a tube inserted into the urinary bladder for drainage
 Infiltrating ductal carcinoma, a type of breast cancer

Technology
 Ideographic Description Characters (Unicode block)
 Internet data center, a facility run by a service provider to house computer systems and associated components for their customers
 Insulation-displacement connector, a connector that pierces the insulation on a wire
 Inter-domain controller, implements Inter-domain Controller protocol for dynamic networking across administrative domains

Music
 IDC (musician), a British musician
 "I Don't Care" (Ed Sheeran and Justin Bieber song), also referred to as "IDC"
 "IDC", a 2015 song by Chastity Belt from their album Time to Go Home

Other uses
 Ideographic Description Characters, symbols for describing the composition of CJK characters
 Independent duty corpsman, a US Navy medical staff position; see United States Marine Air-Ground Task Force Reconnaissance
 Industrial Development Certificate, UK planning licence from the late 1940s to early 1980s
 Intangible drilling costs, an oil and gas industry term
 "I don't care", in Internet/chat slang